Heartland Communications Group, LLC is a radio broadcasting company focused on operating groups of local radio stations in small midwestern markets. Currently, it owns six radio stations in Wisconsin. It has put together geographically adjacent clusters of market-leading radio stations. 

In May 2010, former Armada Media CEO Jim Coursolle and his wife Diane, closed a purchase of a two-thirds interest in owner Heartland Communications, from Granite Equity Partners.

The current station portfolio includes:

 Ashland, Wisconsin
WATW AM 1400, Freedom Talk
WBSZ FM 93.3, Country 
WJJH FM 96.7 & 102.3, Classic Rock
WNXR FM 107.3, Classic Hits 

 Eagle River, Wisconsin
WERL (AM) 950 & 101.7, Freedom Talk
WRJO FM 94.5, Classic Hits

 Rhinelander, Wisconsin
WCYE FM 93.7, Country
WNWX FM 96.5, Hot A/C

Present headquarters for Heartland is located at 909 N. Railroad St., Eagle River, Wisconsin 54521.

References

External links
Heartland Communications Group LLC

Radio broadcasting companies of the United States
Companies based in Wisconsin